The Han card (汉卡) or Lianxiang Han card (联想汉卡) was a type of ISA hardware card for the PC in the 1980s in the People's Republic of China.  The card allowed the input of Chinese characters into computers.

History
The inventor of the card was Ni Guangnan (倪光南) at the Chinese Academy of Engineering.  The product was invented under company Lianxiang (联想集团), which is today's Lenovo.  The first generation of the card was released in 1985.

Model names
 LX-80 Lianxiang Han Card

See also
 Industry Standard Architecture (ISA)

External links
 Hudong Han card

References

Chinese inventions